John Brandon may refer to:

John Brandon (divine) ( 1687), English divine
John Raphael Rodrigues Brandon (1817–1877), British architect
Johnny Brandon (1925–2017), English singer/songwriter
John Brandon (actor) (1929–2014), American film and television actor
John Brandon (MP) for Bishop's Lynn
John Marvin Brandon (1888–1960), politician from Alabama
John Brandon (writer), American writer

See also
John Brandon-Jones (1908–1999), British architect